Siphona boreata is a Palearctic species of fly in the family Tachinidae.

Distribution
Europe, Russia.

References

Tachininae
Diptera of Europe
Insects described in 1960